Morissanda Kouyaté, also known as (Mory Sandan Kouyaté) is a Guinean medical doctor and activist against female genital mutilation. After years of activism, he was appointed Minister of Foreign Affairs, International Cooperation, African Integration and Guineans abroad in October, 2021.

Activism 
Kouyaté co-founded the Inter-African Committee on Harmful Traditional Practices (IAC) in 1984 in Dakar, Senegal. In 2012 he co-authored the UN General Assembly Resolution 67/146, calling on all countries to end FGM.

Awards 
 2020 United Nations Nelson Rolihlahla Mandela Prize, alongside Greek philanthropist Marianna Vardinogiannis.

References 

Living people
Guinean women's rights activists
Politics of Guinea
Guinean human rights activists
Guinean health activists
Guinean people in health professions
Year of birth missing (living people)
Place of birth missing (living people)
Government ministers of Guinea
Foreign Ministers of Guinea